Step Inside This House is the seventh album by Lyle Lovett, released in 1998. In contrast with his earlier albums, populated mostly by songs penned by Lovett, House is a double-length album of cover songs written by fellow Texans.

In choosing songs to record, Lovett favored songwriters whose works influenced his own style instead of immensely popular artists whose name recognition might boost sales. The writers selected include Robert Earl Keen, Michael Martin Murphey, Willis Alan Ramsey, Eric Taylor, and Guy Clark. The second disc is largely dedicated to songs written by Steven Fromholz, Townes Van Zandt and Walter Hyatt, with the final track being a traditional piece.

The title track was written by Guy Clark but does not appear on any of his albums. After learning the song from Clark, Lovett fell in love with it, and Clark gave him permission to include it on this album.

Track listing

Disc one
 "Bears" (Steven Fromholz) – 3:04 
 "Lungs" (Townes Van Zandt) – 2:18 
 "Step Inside This House (Step Inside My House)" (Guy Clark) – 5:29 
 "Memphis Midnight/Memphis Morning" (Eric Taylor) – 4:23 
 "I've Had Enough" (Vince Bell, Craig Calvert) – 3:02 
 "Teach Me About Love" (Walter Hyatt) – 3:52 
 "Sleepwalking" (Willis Alan Ramsey) – 5:39 
 "Ballad of the Snow Leopard and the Tanqueray Cowboy" (David Rodriguez) – 5:51 
 "More Pretty Girls Than One" (traditional) – 2:56 
 "West Texas Highway" (Boomer Castleman, Michael Martin Murphey) – 3:32 
 "Rollin' By" (Robert Earl Keen) – 4:06

Disc two
 "Texas Trilogy: Daybreak" (Fromholz) – 3:17 
 "Texas Trilogy: Train Ride" (Fromholz) – 2:35 
 "Texas Trilogy: Bosque County Romance" (Fromholz) – 4:53 
 "Flyin' Shoes" (Van Zandt) – 4:38 
 "Babes in the Woods" (Hyatt) – 3:04 
 "Highway Kind" (Van Zandt) – 3:27 
 "Lonely in Love" (Hyatt) – 2:45 
 "If I Needed You" (Van Zandt) – 3:46 
 "I'll Come Knockin' " (Hyatt) – 3:24 
 "Texas River Song" (traditional) – 4:09

Personnel
Lyle Lovett – vocals, acoustic guitar
Sam Bush – mandolin
Russ Kunkel – drums
Luis Conte – percussion
Jerry Douglas – dobro, Weissenborn
Stuart Duncan – fiddle
Paul Franklin – pedal steel guitar
Dean Parks – electric guitar
Don Potter – acoustic guitar
John Hagen – cello
Deschamps Hood – harmony vocals
Alison Krauss – harmony vocals
David Ball – harmony vocals
Viktor Krauss – bass
Leland Sklar – bass
Matt Rollings – piano

Production notes
Produced by Lyle Lovett and Billy Williams
Robert Hadley – mastering
Ron Lewter – mastering
Doug Sax – mastering
Nathaniel Kunkel – engineer
John Nelson – assistant engineer
James Gilmer – production assistant
Vance Knowles – production assistant
Kathi Whitley – production coordination
Jonas Livingston – art direction
Tim Stedman – design
Keith Tamashiro – design
Michael Wilson – photography

Chart performance

Weekly charts

Year-end charts

References

1998 albums
Lyle Lovett albums
Tribute albums
MCA Records albums
Music of Texas